The Greater Claim is a 1921 American silent drama film directed by Wesley Ruggles and starring Alice Lake and Jack Dougherty. It was produced and distributed by the Metro Pictures Company.

An incomplete print is preserved in the Library of Congress collection, Packard Campus for Audio-Visual Conservation.

Cast
Alice Lake as Mary Smith
Jack Dougherty as Richard Everard, Charlie
Edward Cecil as Abe Dietz
De Witt Jennings as Richard Everard, Sr.
Florence Gilbert as Gwendolyn
Lenore Lynard as Rosie

References

External links

1921 films
American silent feature films
Films directed by Wesley Ruggles
American black-and-white films
Silent American drama films
1921 drama films
Metro Pictures films
1920s American films